René Steinke (born 16 November 1963 as René Dan Steinke in East Berlin, East Germany), is a German actor, best known in Alarm für Cobra 11 – Die Autobahnpolizei as Kriminalhauptkommissar Tom Kranich. He appeared in the role from 1999 – 2002 and 2004 – 07. He was paired with Erdoğan Atalay, who played Semir Gerkhan.

Selected filmography
 Interrogating the Witnesses (1987)
 Plötzlich Papa – Einspruch abgelehnt! (2008–2012, TV series)

References

External links
 
 Website (in German)

1963 births
Living people
German male film actors
German male television actors
Ernst Busch Academy of Dramatic Arts alumni
Male actors from Berlin